Whitestake is a small village in the South Ribble district of Lancashire, England.  It is situated between Farington and New Longton, and is at the boundary of the parishes of Farington, Longton and Penwortham. It falls in what is called the "Western Parishes" area of South Ribble.

The name Whitestake supposedly originated because residents could stake a claim with a white stick so that their livestock could graze on the moss. This is said to have taken place once a year at the Farmers Arms Public House (still extant).

It is the site of the Turbary Woods Owl and Bird Sanctuary.

References

External links

Geography of South Ribble
Villages in Lancashire